Transport is a sans serif typeface first designed for road signs in the United Kingdom. It was created between 1957 and 1963 by Jock Kinneir and Margaret Calvert as part of their work as designers for the Department of Transport's Anderson and Worboys committees.

History

Before its introduction, British road signs used the capitals-only Llewellyn-Smith alphabet that was introduced following the Maybury Report of 1933 and revised in 1955–57. Older signs, known as fingerposts, tended to use a variety of sans serif alphabets as supplied by their manufacturers. For the kinds of roads on which either of these alphabets was likely to be seen, legibility was not a pressing issue, but the planning and building of Britain's first motorway in the 1950s was a catalyst for change.

The Ministry of Transport appointed an Advisory Committee on Traffic Signs for Motorways under the chairmanship of Sir Colin Anderson in 1957 and Jock Kinneir and his assistant Margaret Calvert were appointed as graphic designers to it. All aspects of signing were investigated and tested, initially on the Preston bypass (1958, now part of the M6 motorway), before their introduction on the (London–Yorkshire) M1 motorway a year later. The committee looked at examples from other European countries as well as the USA but Kinneir and Calvert found them somewhat harsh and unsatisfactory. Instead, they developed a more rounded typeface with distinctive tails to 'a', 't', and 'l', and bar-less fractions, all of which helped legibility.

The department, seeing the successful early results of this work then appointed another committee, under the chairmanship of Sir Walter Worboys and again using Kinneir and Calvert as designers, to look at Traffic Signs for All-Purpose Roads. Work for this also resulted in the introduction of the pictogram signs based on those recommended by the 1949 United Nations World Conference on Road and Motor Transport.

Characteristics

Two forms of the typeface exist; Transport Medium and Transport Heavy. Both have the same basic form, but Transport Heavy is boldface, to allow easier readability of black letters on white backgrounds, such as those used on non-primary roads, while Transport Medium is lighter, and is used for white letters on dark backgrounds, such as the green primary-route signs.

The Transport typefaces are the only ones allowed on UK road signs (except for motorway signs, where route numbers appear in their own separate typeface known as Motorway).

Only a limited number of symbols are available in Transport, mainly those commonly used in road signs, such as apostrophes, the pound sign and certain vulgar fractions such as ½ and ⅓. Various diacritics are also available, for use in languages other than English, such as Welsh and Irish.

Other uses around the world 
Although developed in the United Kingdom, the typeface has been used in many other countries around the world. In addition to the Crown dependencies, British overseas territories and some limited residual usage in Commonwealth states, the typeface is also used in Hong Kong, Iceland, Ireland, Greece, and Portugal, and in much of the Middle East. Denmark uses a variation with added spacing and modified figures. Italy and Spain use bolder variants, called Alfabeto Normale in Italy and Carretera Convencional in Spain (the latter originally only on non-motorway roads, but since 2014 it applies to any new sign both on motorway and non-motorway roads).

In countries where other scripts (such as the Perso-Arabic script) are used, Transport is often used for Latin transliterations. Road signs in the Republic of Ireland use all-caps Transport Heavy for English names; for Irish names, mixed-case Transport Heavy oblique is used with variants for A, a, i, M and N: script a, dotless i, and tall versions of m and n.

In Indonesia, since April 2014, changeable message signs/electronic signs have used Transport.

Use examples 
Bangladesh – road signs
Greece – road signs (Greek letters added)
Hong Kong – road signs
Iceland – road signs
Iran – road signs
Ireland – road signs
Italy – road signs
Indonesia – variable message signs
Malaysia – road signs
Nepal – road signs
Oman – road signs
Portugal – road signs
Qatar – road signs
Singapore – road signs (Parking Area only)
Spain – road signs
United Arab Emirates – road signs
United Kingdom – road signs, government website and some government letters
United States – North Carolina government websites

Digitisations

The original Transport family, with its two weights, has been digitised by URW++.

New Transport
An updated version of the typeface has been developed by Henrik Kubel of A2/SW/HK and Margaret Calvert during 2012, with the family expanded to include six different weights (Thin, Light, Regular, Medium, Bold, Black) with oblique stylings to complement them. It also has other features including text figures and small capitals.

One of its first public uses has been on the UK's revamped central government website, 'GOV.UK', where it has been selected as the sole font for all text. The specific variant is called "GDS Transport".

Logo of the American cybersecurity and data backup company, Datto, Inc. used New Transport Medium typeface.

Transport New
An updated though unofficial family based upon Transport was first released by independent foundry K-Type in 2008. The family includes Light, Medium and Heavy weights along with true italics which were added in 2015.

This family is the main UI typeface of Untitled Goose Game made by House House in 2019.

Other
Jörg Hemker designed two typefaces that are inspired from the Transport typeface: FF Nort and FF Nort Headline. Both typefaces support Greek and Cyrillic.

Gallery

See also 
 Motorway (typeface) — Another font used for motorway route numbers on motorways, also designed by Kinneir & Calvert.
 Rail Alphabet — The equivalent font on Britain's railways, also designed by Kinneir & Calvert.
 Johnston (typeface) — The London Underground font, designed by Edward Johnston.
 Public signage typefaces
 Highway Gothic — A font also used widely around the world for traffic signs.
 DIN 1451 — The German equivalent.

References

External links 
 Department for Transport alphabet drawings
 New Transport – sale, history and .pdf specimen 
 Traffic signs working drawings: TSRGD 2016 schedule 17
 World Transportation Organization The world transportation organization (The Non-Profit Advisory Organization)

Road transport in the United Kingdom
Sans-serif typefaces
Government typefaces
Grotesque sans-serif typefaces
Typefaces and fonts introduced in 1957
Display typefaces